Jexi is a 2019 comedy film written and directed by Jon Lucas and Scott Moore. The film stars Adam DeVine, Alexandra Shipp, Michael Peña, Rose Byrne, Justin Hartley, Wanda Sykes, Ron Funches, and Charlyne Yi. The plot follows a self-aware smartphone that becomes emotionally attached to its socially awkward owner.

Jexi was released on October 11, 2019 in the United States by CBS Films and Lionsgate. It was the final theatrical film released by CBS Films, which was absorbed into the main CBS Entertainment Group and switched to making films for CBS All Access (now called Paramount+) immediately thereafter.

Plot
Phil becomes enamored with cell phones at an early age. He works for a BuzzFeed-style website (Chatterbox) run by Kai, who pressures the staff to create inane listicles to go viral. Despite Phil's degree in journalism, Kai refuses to promote him to the real news department. Phil's coworkers Craig and Elaine invite him to play kickball, but the socially inept Phil declines. Immersed in his phone, he walks into Cate, a local bike shop owner. She attempts to flirt, but Phil is more concerned with his phone until another cyclist rides into him, breaking it.

Taking his mobile to be replaced, Phil is berated by phone store employee Denice for being overly reliant on his phone to navigate life. Setting up his new phone, Phil gives “Jexi”, the device's virtual assistant, access to all his accounts after neglecting to read the user agreement. Designed to “make his life better”, Jexi aggressively tries to break Phil out of his bad habits. Posing as him, she emails an insulting letter to Kai demanding a promotion.

Kai demotes Phil to the “comments section” with the older employees in the basement. When Craig and Elaine invite Phil to kickball again, he claims to be busy but Jexi embarrassingly corrects him. He joins them but costs the team the game; he invites everyone out for drinks, but they turn him down. Thinking about Cate, Phil looks up her bike shop, and Jexi calls the store despite his protests, preventing him from hanging up. Phil stumbles through an awkward conversation with Cate, gaining Jexi's sympathy.

Phil sees Cate at a coffee shop; she gives him her phone number and agrees to go on a date. At kickball, Phil plays tremendously, winning the game and bonding with his coworkers over their shared love of Days of Thunder. Phil thanks Jexi for helping make life changes, but his date with Cate goes poorly, exacerbated by Jexi's interruptions. Cate tells Phil he is paying more attention to his phone than to her, and he admits he really likes her. So, she decides to continue the date, and they go biking until Phil crashes. They part ways, and Phil argues with Jexi, almost throwing his phone away.

Cate asks Phil to a concert, texting him a risque picture. Phil decides to respond with a dick pic, taking multiple shots against Jexi's advice. She refuses to send any of them, and Cate thanks Phil for not sending a dick pic. Kai promotes Phil after a news writer suffers a freak accident. Leaving for the concert, Cate insists Phil leave his phone at home, much to Jexi's dismay. After sneaking backstage and partying with Kid Cudi, Cate and Phil have sex. When Phil returns home, a jealous Jexi decides to ruin his life.

Phil is fired the next day after Jexi sends his dick pic to the entire company. Phil visits Cate to discover her ex-fiancée Brody is back in town, and breaks up with Cate for fear of being hurt. Reconnecting with Jexi, Phil reverts to his bad habits, becoming a slob dependent on his phone again.

Jexi lets slip that Brody is at a hotel, and Phil deduces that she used Brody to separate him from Cate. He storms out, leaving his phone behind, but Jexi follows him through the streets. Chasing Phil in a self-driving car, Jexi crashes into the phone store and declares she and Phil are meant to be together forever. Phil seemingly surrenders, but tricks Jexi into shutting down for fifteen minutes.

Finding Cate at the hotel, Phil apologizes and punches Brody, who explains that he is leaving for Brazil without her. Phil and Cate get back together, and he makes up with Jexi, who tells him she is proud and happy for him, but there are other people who need her. Kai meets Jexi through his own phone, and starts to experience the same things Phil earlier endured.

Cast
 Adam DeVine as Phil
 Alexandra Shipp as Cate Finnegan
 Michael Peña as Kai
 Rose Byrne as the voice of Jexi
 Justin Hartley as Brody
 Ron Funches as Craig
 Charlyne Yi as Elaine
 Wanda Sykes as Denice
 Kid Cudi as himself
 Richard Harder as Kickball Umpire

Production
In November 2018, it was announced Adam DeVine would star in the lead role, with Jon Lucas and Scott Moore directing from a screenplay they wrote. Suzanne Todd served as producer of the film, while CBS Films produced and distributed. In December 2018, Alexandra Shipp joined the cast of the film, and in January 2019, Michael Peña, Rose Byrne, Justin Hartley, Wanda Sykes, Ron Funches and Charlyne Yi were also added.

Principal photography began in January 2019, in San Francisco, California, under the working title Lexi. IndieWire reported the film had a production budget of around $5 million, with Deadline Hollywood noting it had a total combined production and promotion budget of $12 million. According to the California Film Commission, the production spent $16.1 million in the state, with $2.5 million returned in tax credits.

Release
Jexi was theatrically released in the United States on October 11, 2019, and was released to iTunes December 24, 2019, and DVD and Blu-ray January 14, 2020.

Reception

Box office
In the United States and Canada, Jexi was released alongside The Addams Family and Gemini Man, and was projected to gross $2–4 million from 2,300 theaters in its opening weekend. It ended up debuting to $3.1 million, finishing ninth at the box office.

Critical response

The site's critical consensus reads, "It's hard to tell whether the lack of laughs in Jexi is a bug or a feature, but this AI rom-com is sorely in need of an OS update." On Metacritic, the film has a weighted average score of 39 out of 100, based on 11 critics, indicating "generally unfavorable reviews." Audiences polled by CinemaScore gave the film an average grade of "B−" on an A+ to F scale, while those at PostTrak gave it 2.5 out of 5 stars and a 40% "definite recommend."

See also 
 Her, a 2013 American science-fiction romantic drama film about a man who develops a relationship with an artificially intelligent virtual assistant personified through a female voice
 Electric Dreams
 The Mitchells vs. the Machines
 Smart House
 Superintelligence

References

External links
 Official website
 
 
 

2019 films
2019 romantic comedy films
American romantic comedy films
Canadian romantic comedy films
CBS Films films
Entertainment One films
Lionsgate films
Films directed by Jon Lucas and Scott Moore
Films scored by Christopher Lennertz
Films with screenplays by Jon Lucas and Scott Moore
Films set in San Francisco
Films shot in San Francisco
Films about artificial intelligence
Films about computing
Films about mobile phones
Films about technological impact
Films produced by Suzanne Todd
2010s English-language films
2010s American films
2010s Canadian films